Bruce Myers (12 April 1942 – 15 April 2020) was a British actor and director.

Partial filmography

No Blade of Grass (1970) - Bill Riggs
Meetings with Remarkable Men (1979) - Yelov
Measure for Measure (1979, TV movie) - Angelo
The Awakening (1980) - Dr. Khalid
Eaux profondes (1981) - Cameron
Casting (1983, TV series)
Dorothée, danseuse de corde (1983, TV movie) - Georges
Prime Risk : adolescent dans le parking (1985)
Le Génie du faux (1985, TV movie)
The Unbearable Lightness of Being (1988) - Czech Editor
La Révolution française (1989) - Couthon (segment "Années terribles, Les")
The Mahabharata (1990, TV mini-series) - Ganesha / Krishna
Présumé dangereux (1990) - Andreï Sletotchkine
Henry & June (1990) - Jack
Toutes peines confondues (1992) - Scandurat
La joie de vivre (1993) - Karl
Fausto (1993) - Roger
Le Tailleur autrichien (1993, Short) - Franz Reichert
The Browning Version (1994) - Dr. Rafferty
Nostradamus (1994) - Professor
B comme Bolo (1994, TV movie) - Lucien Salomé
No Man's Land (1994, TV series) - Villard
Associations de bienfaiteurs (1995, TV mini-series) - Georges
Quai n°1 (1997, TV series) - Villard
La Mondaine (1997, TV series) - Allen
Disparus (1998) - Man Ray
The Governess (1998) - Rosina's Father
Let There Be Light (1998) - Le Rabbin
Louise (Take 2) (1998) - The Hobo
Un monde presque paisible (2002) - Forest King / Old Tailor
The Tragedy of Hamlet (2002, TV movie) - Polonius / Gravedigger
Frères (2004) - François, le père
The Young Lieutenant (2005) - L'Anglais
Nuage (2007) - Franz
Page Eight (2011, TV movie) - Joseph Pierpan (final film role)

References

1942 births
2020 deaths
20th-century British male actors
21st-century British male actors
British male film actors
British male stage actors
British male television actors
Deaths from the COVID-19 pandemic in France
Male actors from Lancashire
People from Radcliffe, Greater Manchester